Ukraine competes at the 2009 World Championships in Athletics from 15–23 August in Berlin.

References

External links
Official competition website

Nations at the 2009 World Championships in Athletics
World Championships in Athletics
Ukraine at the World Championships in Athletics